The Daniel Galván scandal (also known as Danielgate, in ) was a political scandal in which Mohammed VI, the King of Morocco, issued a pardon for a Spanish convicted serial child-rapist named Daniel Galván. The Spanish citizen was serving a 30 years prison sentence. He was arrested in Morocco in late 2011, for having raped at least 11 Moroccan children in Kenitra—a city he had been living in since 2004. The pardon came some 18 months after his incarceration as part of a diplomatic gesture from Mohammed VI to Spain, on the occasion of the 14th anniversary of his enthronement. The pardon sparked unprecedented popular outrage in Morocco where several protests were held denouncing the monarch's decision. This prompted Mohammed VI to first issue a communiqué in which he denied being "aware of the gravity of the crimes committed by Daniel Galvan", then to "cancel" his pardon but only after the Spanish citizen had already left the country several days before on an expired passport—with the knowledge of Moroccan authorities. It was revealed later that this was not the first time Mohammed VI had pardoned a convicted foreign paedophile, having pardoned Hervé Le Gloannec, a French citizen convicted of child rape and child pornography in 2006.

It was later revealed that Daniel Galvan did not apply for a pardon and only requested to be transferred to a prison in Spain. El Pais wrote that the royal cabinet in an effort to please Spain, sought to accelerate the normal process of prison transfer—which could take up to two years—and accorded the unwarranted pardon for the convicted pedophile.

The scandal
King Mohammed VI customarily pardons large numbers of convicted prisoners on national holidays. In 2009 he pardoned as much as 24,865 of Morocco's ~60,000 inmate's population. In 2005 to celebrate the 50th anniversary of the country's independence, he pardoned 10,000 convicts, among-which 336 foreigners (one of them was a convicted French child molester as a WikiLeaks cable would reveal). As he was celebrating the 14th-anniversary of his enthronement on 30 July 2013, he issued a pardon for 1200 inmates. The MAP—Morocco's state news agency—released a statement declaring that among the pardoned figured 48 Spanish prisoners, which were released as a gesture demonstrating the good relations between the Mohammed VI and King Juan Carlos of Spain who had just visited the country a week earlier.
 
On July 31, internet media platforms Andalus Press and Lakome, revealed that among the pardoned prisoners, figured a Spanish serial child rapist who was arrested in September 2011, and sentenced to 30 years in prison in a very controversial case.  Lakome called the lawyer of the victims—Mohammed Krayri— which confirmed the release of Daniel Galvan, and stated that as of 31 July 2013 he engaged a lawyer to reclaim his assets in Morocco, which were frozen because he did not pay the court-ordered damages to the victims—50,000 Dirhams for each of the 11 victims (~USD5,000). Lakome later reported that Daniel Galvan successfully reclaimed his passport at the Kenitra court and had left the country on Thursday 1 August 2013, through Morocco's effective land border with Spain in the disputed exclave of Ceuta. Daniel reportedly crossed the border on an expired passport with the consent of Moroccan police

Between 30 July and 4 August 2013, there was a media blackout on the scandal in Morocco with the exception of some Online media such as Lakome, Andalus Press, Yabiladi.

As early as Wednesday 31 July there was huge outrage in the Moroccan social media community which culminated by the call for a protest after the Ramadan Ftour meal in the evening of Friday 2 August in front of the parliament in Rabat.

On Friday evening thousands of peaceful protesters gathered before the Parliament building in Rabat. The protest was violently repressed by Moroccan auxiliary forces who beat up the activists, the news reporters and photographers, causing injuries for dozens of them. The police also confiscated filming material and cellphones. The following day—Saturday 3 August—the news of the scandal and the ensuing crackdown on the peaceful protests, made the headlines in most international media (Aljazeera, France 24, CNN ) where pictures of bleeding protesters were shown. On the evening of Saturday —while Morocco's mainstream media were still ignoring the story— Mohammed VI's palace released a statement in which he denied being aware of the gravity of the crimes committed by Daniel Galvan and that an investigation would be ordered to determine where the fault and responsibility lies in his decision.

On Sunday 4 August, news of the story was broadcast on two of France's main news programmes on TF1 and France 2, both named Journal de 13 heures, where footage of the violent police crackdown on Friday's protest was shown. On the evening of the same day Mohammed VI issued a statement in which he announced the cancellation of his pardon. No royal pardon has ever been cancelled in Morocco, though some observers noted that a Royal pardon was in theory irrevocable

On Tuesday 6 August the King held ceremony—largely publicised locally—in which he was shown greeting and hugging the alleged parents and families of the children abused by Daniel Galvan.

On Wednesday 7 August 2013, Daniel Galvan was arrested in Spain after Moroccan authorities filed an international arrest warrant for him. Pictures of the arrest showing Galvan being handcuffed and inside a Spanish police car circulated largely in the Moroccan media. This news and images were very widely reported in Morocco's mainstream and pro-regime press. Spanish courts later refused to extradite him to Morocco.

Precedent

In a leaked diplomatic cable of the US consulate in Casablanca which detailed the Morocco-Human trafficking report for 2010, it was revealed that Mohammed VI had pardoned in 2006 a convicted French child molester. Hervé le Gloannec, was arrested in Marrakech while having sex with a 15-year-old boy and in possession of a large amount of child pornography. He sentenced to 4 years, reduced to 2 years then pardoned by the Moroccan King.

Reactions

Mohammed VI's response

The first reaction of the monarch came on the evening of Saturday 3 August, 4 days after the release of Daniel Galvan. He first published a communiqué read in the evening news of state media. He denied being aware of the gravity of the crimes committed of Daniel Galvan. On Sunday 4 August, the palace cabinet released another statement in which they declare that the pardon for Galvan has been revoked. On Tuesday 5 August, the alleged families of the victims were summoned to the palace where they were filmed being greeted and hugged by Mohammed VI.

On Tuesday, Morocco through its Ministry of Justice, issued an international arrest warrant against Daniel Galvan.

Use of bot accounts to flood Twitter

Public outrage was concentrated in Twitter and Facebook, where the hashtags  and #Danielgate were used to denounce the monarch's decision. Several automated bot accounts flooded these hashtags with tweets which repeated excerpts from the official communiqué of Mohammed VI. A number of these bot accounts were used a few months earlier to promote Mounir Majidi's case in a lawsuit he filed in Paris against Moroccan independent journalist Ahmed Benchemsi.

Spain's reaction

The first official reaction came from the Spanish royal cabinet, they declared that King Juan Carlos had in fact demanded a royal pardon for some Spanish prisoners without further details. They added that it is the Spanish embassy in Morocco who fixed the list of detainees who would be pardoned.

Galván was arrested in Spain and entered prison to finish his sentence in a Spanish prison.
https://elpais.com/politica/2013/11/18/actualidad/1384784298_553411.html

Morocco's cabinet

None of Morocco's political parties or the cabinet reacted to the scandal before the statement of Mohammed VI—with the notable exception of palace affiliated Party of Authenticity and Modernity. This party founded by Fouad Ali El Himma, had some of its members issue a statement before Saturday 3 August which incidentally paraphrased the statement which the palace

The first official Moroccan reaction came from Mustapha Ramid, who released a statement on Friday 2 August, in which he announced that the pardon was the King's decision which was dictated by national interest. He later denied being involved in drafting the list of pardoned prisoners, and stressed that the pardon was an exclusive prerogative of the King, adding that it came as part of strategic relations linking Morocco and Spain and must have been done for higher interests of the nation and came as a result of the relations between two kings.

Moroccan media

Before Monday 5 August, Morocco's printed press did not cover the scandal nor the strong reactions it was causing on social media websites, with the exception of "Akhbar al-Yawm"–a daily edited by journalist Taoufik Bouachrine.
 
Similarly Moroccan Radios and TV (note: all broadcast channels are state-owned in Morocco) did not cover the story before the statements of the palace.

Civil society and online activists

Reactions of Morocco's officially registered NGOs were almost unanimously limited to restating the position expressed in Mohmmed VI's press releases. Najat Anouar, president of "Matqich Waldi", an anti-child sexual abuse NGO, stated that the pardon was an exclusive prerogative of the King which he had the discretion of using. The NGO failed to comment or express opposition to the pardon.

The process of the Royal pardon in Morocco

According to the Dahir n° 1-57-387 of 16 rejeb 1377 (6 February 1958), the Royal pardon is an exclusive and discretionary prerogative of the Moroccan King. It must however pass through a process in which a commission gives preliminary advice for the King who makes the ultimate decision.

According to the aforementioned Dahir, this "Pardon commission" is composed of the following:

 The Minister of Justice, his deputy or the president of his cabinet (Mustapha Ramid and his Chief-of-cabinet Mohamed Benalilou)
 The Director of the royal cabinet or his deputy (officially Rochdi Chraibi)
 The first president of the Supreme court of his representative (Mustapha Fares)
 The general prosecutor of the supreme court or his representative (Mustapha Madah)
 The director of the directorate for "criminal affairs and pardons" or his representative (Mohamed Abdennabaoui)
 The director of the penitentiary administration or his representative (Hafid Benhachem) 
 Secretariat of the commission is conducted by a civil servant of the Ministry of Justice

The commission is tasked with examining the requests for pardon which are submitted by the prisoners themselves. It then emits a consultative opinion to the royal cabinet with the King having the final discretionary decision.
Royal pardons in Morocco are common and are not published on the country's official bulletin. Only the number of pardoned convicts is communicated to the public in a press release of the MAP (Morocco state's press agency).
After the scandal Mohammed VI promised to reform the pardon process. Apart from dismissing Hafid Benhachem (then 77 years old), it is not known if any further actions were taken.

Other controversial pardons

It was also revealed that amongst the pardoned figured a drug trafficking suspect, who was released before standing trial. He had resisted arrest using a firearm. There was, Antonio Garcia, a recidivist drug trafficker arrested in possession of 9 tons of Hashish in Tangiers and sentenced to 10 years. Some media claimed that his release embarrassed Spain.

Aftermath

Arrest of Ali Anouzla and censorship of Lakome

Ali Anouzla, editor-in-chief of the Arabic version of Lakome, which had revealed the scandal, was arrested on 17 September on terrorism charges after he had linked to an El Pais article containing a video allegedly from AQIM. Additionally, independent media platform Lakome.com was blocked in Morocco starting on 17 October 2013.

The crimes of Daniel Galvan

In his apartment in Kenitra, Daniel Galvan raped and filmed at least 11 Moroccan children aged 2–15, the victims were:

Nawal (2 years old)
Rkia (8 years old)
Saïdia (9 years old)
Souad (6 years old)
Aziza (6 years old)
Omar (15 years old)
Amal (6 years old)
Intissar (6 years old)
Fatima (11 years old)
Karima (7 years old)
Hanane (5 years old)

See also
Morocco-Spain relations

References

Mohammed VI of Morocco
2013 in Morocco
2013 in Spain
Child sexual abuse in Morocco
2013 scandals
Political scandals in Morocco
Recipients of Moroccan royal pardons
Protests in Morocco